The Ballestas Islands (Spanish: Islas Ballestas) are a group of small islands near the town of Paracas within the Paracas District of the Pisco Province in the Ica Region, on the south coast of Peru.

Geography 

Composed largely of rock formations and covering an estimated area of 0.12 km², these islands are an important sanctuary for marine fauna like the guanay guano bird, the blue-footed booby and the tendril. Other notable species include Humboldt penguins and two varieties of seals (fur seals and sea lions), amongst other mammals.

Access 
These islands are accessible from the resort town of Paracas (near Pisco) by tour boat which typically lasts 2 hours. During the visits it is not uncommon for the sea lions to approach the tourist boats and make spectacles for the visiting tourists.

On the way to the islands, on the Paracas Peninsula, visitors will notice El Candelabro, a large-scale geoglyph that may have served as a beacon to mariners. The mystery as to the origins of this particular geoglyph is ongoing with much speculation. 
The visit to the Ballestas Islands is, from an ecotourism point of view, probably the best known along the Peruvian coast.

References

Further reading

External links 

Black and white pictures of wildlife

Uninhabited islands of Peru
Landforms of Ica Region
Tourist attractions in Ica Region
Rock formations of Peru
Pacific islands of Peru